Capricorn (Latin for "horned goat") is the tenth astrological sign in the zodiac out of twelve total zodiac signs, originating from the constellation of Capricornus, the goat. It spans the 270–300th degree of the zodiac, corresponding to celestial longitude.  Under the tropical zodiac, the sun transits this area from about December 22 to January 19.  In astrology, Capricorn is considered an earth sign, negative sign, and one of the four cardinal signs. Capricorn is said to be ruled by the planet Saturn.

There appears to be a connection between traditional characterizations  of Capricorn as a sea goat and the Sumerian god of wisdom and waters, who also had the head and upper body of a goat and the lower body and tail of a fish. Later known as Ea in Akkadian and Babylonian mythology, Enki was the god of  intelligence (gestú, literally "ear"), creation, crafts; magic; water, seawater and lake water (a, aba, ab).

Cultural significance 
In India, the zodiac sign of Capricorn is celebrated as the Makara Sankranti festival, also known in Nepal as Maghe Sankranti. The Indian astronomical calendar is not based on the western Gregorian or Julian date keeping system. The Gregorian calendar has fixed days in a year and does not accommodate difference in the actual solar year. Therefore, the festival is celebrated on either of January 14 or 15 every year, when, as per the Indian astronomical calendar, the Sun actually enters the Capricorn sign.

Gallery

See also

Astronomical symbols
Chinese zodiac
Circle of stars
Cusp (astrology)
Elements of the zodiac

References

Citations

Sources
 Longitude of Sun, apparent geocentric ecliptic of date, interpolated to find time of crossing 0°, 30°.... The year stated applies to the December date; the year for the January date is one year greater.

External links
 
 
 Warburg Institute Iconographic Database (over 300 medieval and early modern images of Capricorn)

Western astrological signs
Mythological caprids